The 2021 Major League Baseball postseason was the playoff tournament of Major League Baseball (MLB) for the 2021 season. The winners of the League Division Series advanced to the League Championship Series to determine the pennant winners that face each other in the World Series. After the 2020 MLB postseason, MLB returned to a 10-team playoff format following the loosening of COVID-19 pandemic restrictions. This was the last postseason to feature the 10-team format, as the league expanded to a 12 team-format for the 2022 postseason.

In the American League, the Houston Astros and New York Yankees both returned to the postseason for the sixth time in the previous seven years, the Tampa Bay Rays returned for the third year in a row, the Chicago White Sox made their second straight appearance, and the Boston Red Sox returned for the fourth time in the previous six years.

In the National League, the Los Angeles Dodgers returned to the postseason for the ninth straight time, the Atlanta Braves and Milwaukee Brewers returned for the fourth year in a row, the St. Louis Cardinals returned for the third straight time, and the San Francisco Giants made their first appearance since 2016. This was the fourth postseason in the previous five years to feature at least three 100-win teams (Rays, Dodgers, and Giants).

The postseason began on October 5, and ended on November 2, with the Braves defeating the Astros in six games in the 2021 World Series. It was the first title for the Braves since 1995 and fourth overall.

Playoff seeds
The following teams qualified for the postseason:

American League
 Tampa Bay Rays – 100–62, Clinched AL East
 Houston Astros – 95–67, Clinched AL West
 Chicago White Sox – 93–69, Clinched AL Central
 Boston Red Sox – 92–70 (10–9 head-to-head record vs. NYY)
 New York Yankees – 92–70 (9–10 head-to-head record vs. BOS)

National League
 San Francisco Giants - 107–55, Clinched NL West
 Milwaukee Brewers - 95–67, Clinched NL Central
 Atlanta Braves - 88–73, Clinched NL East
 Los Angeles Dodgers - 106–56
 St. Louis Cardinals - 90–72

Playoff bracket

American League Wild Card

(4) Boston Red Sox vs. (5) New York Yankees 

This was the fifth postseason meeting in the history of the Yankees-Red Sox rivalry. The Yankees defeated the Red Sox in the ALCS in 1999 and 2003, while the Red Sox defeated the Yankees in the 2004 ALCS and 2018 ALDS. The Red Sox defeated the Yankees 6–2 to advance to the ALDS. With the win, the Red Sox moved up to 3–2 all time against the Yankees in the postseason.

National League Wild Card

(4) Los Angeles Dodgers vs. (5) St. Louis Cardinals 

This was the sixth postseason meeting between these two teams. The game remained tied into the bottom of the ninth inning, when the Dodgers' Chris Taylor hit a walk-off 2-run home run off Alex Reyes, giving the Dodgers a 3–1 victory and a ninth straight trip to the NLDS.

American League Division Series

(1) Tampa Bay Rays vs. (4) Boston Red Sox 

This was the third postseason meeting between the Rays and Red Sox. The Rays won the 2008 ALCS, while the Red Sox struck back in the 2013 ALDS. The Red Sox defeated the top seeded Rays to advance to the ALCS for the first time since 2018. As of 2022, this is the most recent playoff series victory by the Red Sox.

(2) Houston Astros vs. (3) Chicago White Sox 

This was the second postseason meeting between the Astros and White Sox. When the team was still in the National League, the Astros met the White Sox in the 2005 World Series, which the White Sox won in a sweep to end the Curse of the Black Sox. The Astros defeated the White Sox in four games to advance to the ALCS for the fifth year in a row.

As of 2022, this is the last time the White Sox made the postseason.

National League Division Series

(1) San Francisco Giants vs. (4) Los Angeles Dodgers 

This was the first postseason meeting in the history of the Dodgers-Giants rivalry, and the first LDS series between two teams that had won 100 games or more in the regular season. The Dodgers upset the MLB-best Giants in five games to advance to the NLCS for the fifth time in the past six years.

As of 2022, this is the last time the Giants have appeared in the postseason.

(2) Milwaukee Brewers vs. (3) Atlanta Braves 

This was the first postseason meeting between the Brewers and Braves. The Braves defeated the Brewers in four games to advance to the NLCS for the second year in a row.

As of 2022, this is the last time the Brewers have appeared in the postseason.

American League Championship Series

(4) Boston Red Sox vs. (2) Houston Astros 

This was the third postseason meeting between the Red Sox and Astros. The two teams split the previous two meetings, in 2017 (won by the Astros), and 2018 (won by the Red Sox). The Astros defeated the Red Sox in six games to advance to the World Series for the third time in five years.

Both teams split the first two games in Houston. When the series shifted to Boston, the Red Sox blew out the Astros by a 12-3 score to go up 2-1 in the series. However, their lead would not hold. The Astros responded by blowing out the Red Sox in Games 4 and 5 to take a 3-2 series lead headed back to Houston. In Game 6, the Astros shut out the Red Sox to secure the pennant.

As of 2022, this is the last time the Red Sox have appeared in the postseason. The Astros would win the AL pennant again the next year, sweeping the New York Yankees.

National League Championship Series

(3) Atlanta Braves vs. (4) Los Angeles Dodgers 

This was the fifth postseason matchup between the Dodgers and Braves. The previous meetings were the 1996 NLDS (won by the Braves), 2013 NLDS, 2018 NLDS, and 2020 NLCS (the latter three won by the Dodgers). The Braves pulled off a major upset of the defending World Series champion Dodgers in six games, and returned to the World Series for the first time since 1999.

2021 World Series

(AL2) Houston Astros vs. (NL3) Atlanta Braves 

This was the first World Series played entirely in the South. The Astros and Braves had previously met in the postseason five times, in the NLDS when the Astros were still a National League team. Of those five series, the Braves won three (1997, 1999, and 2001) while the Astros won two (2004 and 2005). The Braves defeated the Astros in six games, capturing their first World Series title since 1995. The Braves took Game 1 in Houston to gain the home field advantage, while the Astros took Game 2 to tie the series. In Atlanta, the Braves shut out the Astros in Game 3, and defeated them by one run in Game 4 to go up three games to one. The Astros rallied to win Game 5 to send the series back to Houston, but the Braves would shut out the Astros in a blowout win to capture the title.

With the win, the Braves moved up to 4-2 all time against the Astros in the postseason. This was the third consecutive World Series won by the National League. With the loss, the Astros' record in the World Series fell to 1-3, with all three losses occurring at their home venue, Minute Maid Park.

The Braves returned to the postseason again the next year, but were upset by the Philadelphia Phillies in the NLDS, who went on a Cinderella run to the World Series. The Astros returned to the World Series again the next year, and defeated the aforementioned Phillies team in six games to win their second championship.

References

External links
 League Baseball Standings & Expanded Standings – 2021

 
Major League Baseball postseason